Pollution of the Ganges, the largest river in India, poses significant threats to human health and the larger environment. The river, which is severely polluted with human waste and industrial contaminants,  provides water to about 40% of India's population across 11 states, serving an estimated population of 500 million people, which is more than any other river in the world.

Today, the Ganges is considered to be the fifth-most polluted river in the world. An Indian photographer has noted that no one in India spoke of the Ganges as being polluted until the late 1970s. However, pollution had been an old and continuous process in the river by the time people were finally acknowledging it.

A number of initiatives were undertaken to clean the river, but failed to deliver significant results. After getting elected, India's Prime Minister Narendra Modi affirmed to work on cleaning the river and controlling pollution. Subsequently, the Namami Ganga project was announced by the government in the June 2014 budget. An estimated Rs 3,000 crores (US$460 million) had been spent by July 2016 in various efforts to clean up the river.

Causes
The main causes of water pollution in the Ganges river, like many other rivers, are the disposal of human sewage and animal waste, increasing              population density, and disposal of  industrial waste into the river.

Human waste
The river flows through 100 cities with populations over 100,000; 97 cities with population between 50,000 to 100,000, and about 48 towns. A large proportion of the sewage water with higher organic load in the Ganges is from this population through domestic water usage.

Industrial waste
Because of the establishment of a large number of industrial cities on the bank of the Ganges like Kanpur, Prayagraj, Varanasi and Patna, countless tanneries, chemical plants, textile mills, distilleries, slaughterhouses, and hospitals prosper and grow along with this and actively play a role in polluting the Ganges by dumping untreated waste into it. One coal-based power plant on the banks of the Pandu River, a Ganges tributary near the city of Kanpur, burns 600,000 tons of coal each year and produces 210,000 tons of fly ash. The ash is dumped into ponds from which a slurry is filtered, mixed with domestic wastewater, and then released into the Pandu River. Fly ash contains toxic heavy metals such as lead and copper. The amount of parts per million of copper released in the Pandu before it even reaches the Ganga is a thousand times higher than in uncontaminated water. 
Industrial effluents are about 12% of the total volume of effluent reaching the Ganges. Although a relatively low proportion, they are a cause for major concern because they are often toxic and non-biodegradable. Plastic and industrial waste, such as wastewater from the factories that sit on the banks of the Ganga, is another cause of pollution. The most worrying problem facing the river is its increasing lack of water. Water for irrigation is being removed faster than the rainy season can replenish it.

Religious traditions
During festival seasons, over 70 million people bathe in the Ganges to cleanse themselves of their past sins. Some materials like food, waste or leaves are left in the Ganges, which are also responsible for its pollution.
Traditional beliefs hold that being cremated on its banks and floating down the Ganges will cleanse the sins of those who die and carry them directly to salvation. In Varanasi alone, an estimated forty thousand bodies are cremated every year and are deposited into the Ganga.  Because many families cannot afford the high cost of sufficient quantities of cremation wood, many of the bodies deposited into the Ganges are only half-burnt.

Dams and pumping stations
Built in 1854 during the British colonization of India, the Haridwar dam has led to decay of the Ganges by greatly diminishing the flow of the river. The Farakka Barrage was built originally to divert fresh water into the Hooghly River but has since caused an increase of salinity in the downstream of the Ganges, having a damaging effect on the ground water and soil along the river. The barrage has caused major tension between Bangladesh and India. Bangladesh is actively considering to construct Ganges Barrage Project for mitigating the salinity problem. The government of India has planned about 300 dams on the Ganges and its tributaries in the near future despite a government-commissioned green panel report that has recommended scrapping 34 of the dams citing environmental concerns.

Three more barrages across the Ganges main river are existing at Bijnor, Narora and Kanpur. The barrages at Bijnor and Narora divert all the water including baseflows during dry season to the canals for irrigating vast area up to Allahabad city. Most of the water available at the upstream of the Kanpur barrage is used during dry season for the drinking water needs of cities. Downstream of Kanpur barrage, adequate water is not available from the barrage to dilute the polluted water reaching the main river during the dry seasons of year.

There are number of pumping stations located on the banks (right and left) of the Ganges downstream of Kanpur barrage serving the irrigation requirements of huge area. These large pump houses are located at Rukunpur , Kanjauli Kachhar , Hakanipur Kalan , Bhosawali , Shekpur , Chochakpur , Lamui , Chausa , etc. (Refer to Google Earth maps.) These lift irrigation schemes are pumping out most of the base flows available in the main river down stream of Kanpur city.

To make the Ganges live/flowing and dilute the polluted water inflows from habitations and industries, at least 5000 cusecs flow is required from Narora to Farakka as minimum environmental flow during the eight months dry season. This is possible by constructing storage reservoirs of capacity 100 Tmcft across the Ganges tributaries located up stream of Narora city and reserving the stored water only for minimum environmental flows. In addition, a series of cascading barrage cum bridges are to be constructed across the river from Kanpur to Allahabad to increase the surface area of impounded polluted water in the river so that it serves as vast natural oxidation ponds. The accumulated sediments/sludge would get washed away during the annual monsoon floods. Already, a number of barrages are planned between Farakka and Allahabad to make the 1620 km length of the river navigable from Haldia to Allahabad under National Waterway 1 project which can be extended up the Kanpur.

Statistics
A 2006 measurement of pollution in the Ganges revealed that river water monitoring over the previous 12 years had demonstrated fecal coliform counts up to 100,000,000 MPN (most probable number) per 100 mL and biological oxygen demand levels averaging over 40 mg/L in the most polluted part of the river in Varanasi. The overall rate of water-borne/enteric disease incidence, including acute gastrointestinal disease, was estimated to be about 66%.

A systematic classification done by Uttarakhand Environment Protection and Pollution Control Board's (UEPPCB) on river waters into the categories A: safe for drinking, B: safe for bathing, C: safe for agriculture, and D: excessive pollution, put the Ganges in D. Coliform bacteria levels in the Ganges have also been tested to be at 5,500, a level too high to be safe for agricultural use let alone drinking and bathing.

The leather industry in Kanpur which employs around 50,000 people in more than 400 tanneries uses chemicals such as toxic chromium compounds. Effectively, chromium levels have not decreased in the Ganges even after a common treatment plant was established in 1995. It now stands at more than 70 times the recommended maximum level.

A study conducted by the National Cancer Registry Program (NCRP) under the Indian Council of Medical Research in 2012, suggested that "those living along its banks in Uttar Pradesh, Bihar and Bengal are more prone to cancer than anywhere else in the country".

In 2020, a study showed that the level of cleaniless has significantly improved in the recent years in terms of toxic heavy metals. This study was supported by Indo-US Science and Technology Forum (IUSSTF).

Effects

Marine life
The results of mercury analysis in various specimens collected along the basin indicated that some fish muscles tended to accumulate high levels of mercury. Of it, approximately 50–84% was organic mercury. A strong positive correlation between mercury levels in muscle with food habit and fish length was found.

The Ganges river dolphin is one of few species of fresh water dolphins in the world. Listed as an endangered species, their population is believed to be less than 2000. Hydroelectric and irrigation dams along the Ganges that prevents the dolphins from travelling up and down river is the main reason for their reducing population.
The Ganges softshell turtle (Nilssonia gangetica) is found in the Ganges, Indus, and Mahanadi river systems of Pakistan, northern India, Bangladesh, and southern Nepal. This turtle inhabits deep rivers, streams, large canals, lakes and ponds, with a bed of mud or sand. According to the International Union for Conservation of Nature, freshwater turtle species are vulnerable. Due to their long lifespan and high trophic level in the aquatic food web, turtles are vulnerable to heavy metals pollution, a major kind of pollution in the Ganges.

Wildlife
Some of the dams being constructed along the Ganges basin will submerge substantial areas of nearby forest. For example, the Kotli-Bhel dam at Devprayag will submerge 1200 hectares of forest, wiping out the forest area and eventually the wildlife.

Human beings
An analysis of the Ganges water in 2006 and 2007 showed significant associations between water-borne/enteric disease and the use of the river for bathing, laundry, washing, eating, cleaning utensils, and brushing teeth. Water in the Ganges has been correlated to contracting dysentery, cholera, hepatitis, as well as severe diarrhoea which continues to be one of the leading causes of death of children in India.
During the summer and monsoon, hospital wards teem with children who need treatment for waterborne diseases - but according to S.C. Singh, a paediatrician at Varanasi Shiv Prasad Gupta Hospital, their parents rarely mention that they have been swimming in the river. They don't appear to have made the connection, he says.

Cleanup efforts

Ganga Mahasabha
Ganga Mahasabha is an Indian organization dedicated to the Ganges, founded by Madan Mohan Malaviya in 1905.
After a long struggle, British India agreed on 5 November 1914. According to it the uninterrupted flow of the Ganges is the rudimentary right of Hindus. The day is known as a 'Aviral Ganga Samjhauta Divas' (Uninterrupted Ganga flow agreement day) in the history of India and the agreement came into existence on 19 December 1916 which is known as Agreement of 1916. The sanctity of the agreement is not preserved by the state and central governments of India after independence though it is legally valid. More and more river water is diverted for irrigation use converting the river into a polluted sewer.

Ganga Action Plan 

The Ganga Action Plan (GAP) was launched by Rajiv Gandhi, the then Prime Minister of India, in June 1986 with covering 25 Class I towns (6 in Uttar Pradesh, 4 in Bihar and 15 in West Bengal); Rs 862.59 crore were spent. Its main objective was to improve the water quality by the interception, diversion, and treatment of domestic sewage and to prevent toxic and industrial chemical wastes from identified polluting units from entering the river. The other objectives of the GAP are as follows:
Control of non-point from human defecation, cattle wallowing, and the disposal of human remains in the river.
Research and development to conserve the biotic diversity of the river to augment its productivity.
Development of sewage treatment technology such as Up-flow Anaerobic Sludge Blanket (UASB) and sewage treatment through afforestation.
Rehabilitation of soft-shelled turtles for pollution abatement.
Resource recovery options such as methane production for energy generation and use of aquaculture for revenue generation.
To act as a trendsetter for taking up similar action plans in other grossly polluted stretches in other rivers.
The ultimate objective of the GAP is to have an approach of integrated river basin management considering the various dynamic interactions between abiotic and biotic eco-system.

Notwithstanding some delay in the completion of the first phase of the GAP, it has generated considerable interest and set the scene for evolving a national approach towards replicating this program for the other polluted rivers of the country. The Government of India proposed to extend this model with suitable modifications to the national level through a National River Action Plan (NRAP). The NRAP mainly draws upon the lessons learned and the experience gained from the GAP besides seeking the views of the State Governments and the other concerned Departments/Agencies. Under the NRCP scheme, the CPCB had conducted river basin studies and had identified 19 gross polluted stretches and 14 less polluted stretches along 19 rivers, which include 11 stretches situated along 7 rivers of M.P. It was much more effective as compared to the previously launched programs.

Phase II covered 59 towns in five states. More than Rs 5.053 Billion were spent. Rivers such as Yamuna, Gomti, Damodar, Mahananda had separate action plans.

National Ganga River Basin Authority (NGRBA) 

NGRBA was established by the Central Government of India, on 20 February 2009 under Section 3 of the Environment Protection Act, 1986. It declared the Ganges as the "National River" of India. The chair includes the Prime Minister of India and chief ministers of states through which the Ganges flows. In 2011, the World Bank approved $1 billion in funding for the National Ganges River Basin Authority.

2010 Government clean-up campaign 
In 2010, it was announced that "the Indian government has embarked on a $4 billion campaign to ensure that by 2020 no untreated municipal sewage or industrial runoff enters the 1,560-mile river." A World Bank spokesman described the plan in 2011, saying:

Earlier efforts to clean the Ganges concentrated on a few highly polluting towns and centres and addressed 'end-of-the-pipe' wastewater treatment there; Mission Clean Ganga builds on lessons from the past, and will look at the entire Gangetic basin while planning and prioritising investment instead of the earlier town-centric approach.

Lobby group Sankat Mochan Foundation (SMF) "is working with GO2 Water Inc., a Berkeley, California, wastewater-technology company" to design a new Sewage treatment system for Varanasi.

The Supreme Court of India has been working on the closure and relocation of many of the industrial plants like Tulsi along the Ganges. In 2010 the government declared the stretch of river between Gaumukh and Uttarkashi an Eco-sensitive zone.

Namami Gange Programme

In the budget tabled in Parliament on 10 July 2014, the Union Finance Minister Arun Jaitley announced an integrated Ganges development project titled 'Namami Gange' (meaning 'Obeisance to the Ganges river') and allocated 2,037 crore for this purpose. The objectives were effective abatement of pollution, conservation, and rejuvenation of the Ganges. Under the project, 8 states are covered. Ministry of Drinking Water Supply and Sanitation proposes to make 1,674 gram panchayats by the Ganges open defecation-free , at a cost of Rs 1,700 cr (central share). An estimated Rs 2,958 Crores (US$460 million) have been spent till July 2016 in various efforts in cleaning up of the river.

As a part of the program, government of India ordered the shut down of 48 industrial units around the Ganges.

The program has a budget outlay of Rs. 20,000 crore for the next five years. This is a significant five-fold increase over the expenditure in the past 30 years (Government of India incurred an overall expenditure of approximately Rs. 4000 crore on this task since 1985). The centre will now take over 100% funding of various activities/ projects under this program. Taking a leaf from the unsatisfactory results of the earlier Ganga Action Plans, the centre now plans to provide for operation and maintenance of the assets for a minimum 10-year period, and adopt a PPP/SPV approach for pollution hotspots.

In an attempt to bolster enforcement the centre also plans to establish a four-battalion Ganga Eco-Task Force. The program emphasises on improved co-ordination mechanisms between various ministries/agencies of central and state governments. Major infrastructure investments which fall under the original mandate of other ministries viz. Urban Development (UD), Drinking Water & Sanitation (DWS), Environment Forests & Climate Change (EF&CC) etc., will be undertaken in addition.

'Namami Gange' will focus on pollution abatement interventions namely interception, diversion and treatment of waste water flowing through the open drains through bio-remediation / appropriate in-situ treatment / use of innovative technologies / sewage treatment plants (STPs) / effluent treatment plant (ETPs); rehabilitation and augmentation of existing STPs and immediate short term measures for arresting pollution at exit points on river front to prevent inflow of sewage etc.

Significantly the approach is underpinned by socio-economic benefits that the program is expected to deliver in terms of job creation, improved livelihoods and health benefits to the vast population that is dependent on the river.

The main pillars of Namami Gange Programme are:
 Sewerage Treatment Infrastructure
 River-Front Development
 River-Surface Cleaning
 Bio-Diversity
 Afforestation
 Public Awareness
 Industrial Effluent Monitoring
 Ganga Gram

Namami Gange Mission-II 
With the success of the Namami Gange Programme, the government of India allocated Rs 22,500 crore for Namami Gange Mission-II which shall boost the maintenance of the Ganga ( funds allocated till 2026). From FY 2014–15 through January 31, 2023, the government has given the National Mission for Clean Ganga (NMCG) a total of Rs 14,084.72 crore. Of that amount, the NMCG has given out Rs 13,607.18 crore to state governments, state missions for clean Ganga, and other organizations for the implementation of projects related to Ganga rejuvenation.

Ganga Manthan
Ganga Manthan was a national conference held to discuss issues and possible solutions for cleaning the river.

The conference aimed to take feedback from stakeholders and prepare a road map for rejuvenating the Ganges. The event was organised by the National Mission for Clean Ganga (NMCG) on 7 July 2014 at Vigyan Bhawan in New Delhi.

Nepal to release water during lean flow period

Nepal has constructed many barrages (excluding joint projects with India) or pump houses to divert the lean season river flows for irrigation purpose. India being lower riparian state has right to claim share out of the river water flows from Nepal similar to India entered into river water sharing agreement with Bangladesh recognising it as lower riparian state. Till now there is no bilateral agreement between India and Nepal adhering to equitable sharing of river waters during the lean season. When Nepal releases water into India during the lean flow period, it would help in cleaning / diluting the polluted waters of downstream Ganges river up to Farakka barrage.

Water diversion from Manasarovar lake

For restoring the minimum environmental flows, it is difficult to identify nearly 100 Tmcft storage reservoirs in the hilly region of Ganges basin in India as the river is flowing through steep valleys. Already big storage reservoirs like Tehri and Ramganga are constructed at feasible locations.

It holds more than 100 tmcft water in its top 13 metres depth. At present it is overflowing into nearby Lake Rakshastal which is a landlocked saltwater endorheic lake.

The diverted water available continuously can be used in China for hydroelectric power generation where the head drop available is in excess of 800 metres over a 40 km long stretch. This would be a joint project of China, Nepal and India for controlling river water pollution and making the Ganges river live and flowing throughout the year. With the diversion of Manasarovar lake water to Ganges basin, Lake Rakshastal would turn into a soda lake with further increase in water salinity which is useful in abstracting the water-soluble chemicals on a commercial scale.

The fresh water inflows into Manasarovar lake can be augmented further substantially by gravity diversion of the inflows available from the major catchment area of Rakshastal lake to Manasarovar lake by constructing an earth dam isolating northern tip of Rakshastal lake where it is fed by its substantial catchment area and also connected to the Manasarovar lake.

Utilisation of Ganges and Brahmaputra flood waters to fight pollution in all rivers of India

A fresh water coastal reservoir with massive storage capacity can be established on the shallow sea area adjoining West Bengal, Odisha and Bangladesh coast by constructing sea dikes / bunds/ causeway up to the depth of 20 metres. Water can be pumped from this artificial fresh water lagoon throughout the year with abundant hydro, wind and solar power resources of India to many river basins in India for meeting needs of agriculture, maintaining environmental flows, salt export requirements, etc. Nearly 360 billion cubic metres (bcm) storage capacity fresh water coastal reservoir/lagoon can be located on the sea area which stretches from coast of south eastern Bangladesh (near ) to the mouth of Brahmani River (near ). The dike would be envisaged with gated barrages to pass to the sea the excess flood waters (total mean annual flow 1200 bcm) received from the Ganges, Brahmaputra, etc. rivers for limiting the maximum reservoir level (FRL) to nearly 2.0 m above MSL (below local high tide level).

From this coastal reservoir, water is pumped to the Brahmani river basin for further transfer to basins of Damodar River, Subarnarekha River, Brahmani River, Mahanadi River  in Jharkhand, Odisha, Chhattisgarh and West Bengal states. The Hasdeo Bango reservoir (near ) would receive the Ganges water via Hirakud reservoir and further pumped into the Narmada, Sone, Tapti, Yamuna, Chambal, Ghaggar, Ganges, etc. river basins for using in Maharashtra, Madhya Pradesh, Chhattisgarh, Uttar Pradesh, Bihar, Rajasthan, Gujarat, Haryana and Delhi states. See Google earth maps for more geographical information. Further, water can be pumped into the Bagh reservoir and Upper Indravati reservoir located in Godavari River basin to transfer Ganges water into Godavari and Krishna river basins.

The advantage of this scheme is that Ganges and Bramhaputra river waters can be stored on Bay of Bengal sea area and nearly 1050 bcm water is transferred throughout the year to other river basins including Ganges basin at optimum pumping head.

Nearly 1000 million tons (500 million cubic metres) of sediment annually from Ganges and Brahmaputra rivers is settling in the sea coast of Bangladesh and India, and the sea area is shallow (up to 20 m depth) for 60 km wide on average. Bangladesh, plagued with high population density, can reclaim nearly 7,500 km2 (5% of its total land) area of sea by excavating/dredging sediment from the fresh water lagoon bed without any effect on the water storage of the coastal reservoir.

The presence of the protective sea dike makes sub sea soil dredging easier and economical through protection from rough sea waves. This reclaimed area from the sea can be utilised for locating a megacity to cater to the modern needs of Bangladesh. This coastal dike would protect the Bangladesh from the wave and tidal activity during the frequent cyclones preventing human and property losses drastically and also from sea level rise due to global warming. Thus Bangladesh would also benefit immensely with this coastal reservoir project.

The sea dike top level at 8 m above the mean sea level and 50 m wide at the top surface, would be nearly 600 km long connecting Indian mainland to South east of Bangladesh forming transnational high way and rail route from the Indian subcontinent to East Asia up to Singapore and China.  Also this dike can be used as access way connecting deep sea ports located close to this dike. The proposed dike would be similar to the land reclamation of North Sea area called Delta Works in Netherlands. The experience of the Saemangeum Seawall already constructed in South Korea which is 33 km long and with 36 metres average depth, can be utilised for this project which is a lesser challenging project. Locks arrangement (similar to Panama canal) would be provided for the movement of ships from the open sea to harbours located in Bangladesh and India.

The off shore earth dam extending up to +8 m msl height, is in the form of two parallel dikes separated by 1000 metres gap. The main purpose of the twin dikes is to prevent any sea water seepage into coastal reservoir as its water level is below the sea level. The water level between the dikes is always maintained 2 to 3 m above the sea level by pumping fresh water from the coastal reservoir into the 1000 m gap between the dikes. The higher level water barrier between the two dikes fully eliminate any sea water seepage in to the coastal reservoir by establishing fresh water seepage to the sea. The 600 km long, 1000 m gap between the two dikes is also used as deep water mega harbor for shipping, ship breaking, ship building, etc. For shipping purpose, the breakwater outer dike facing the sea is envisaged with few locks fitted with twin gates for access to the open sea. The top surface of inner dike would serve as access to the main land from the mega harbor with rail and road links. The coastal reservoir whose full reservoir water level (FRL) is at 0.0 m msl, would also reduce drastically the cyclone damage and flooding in adjacent coastal areas.

The cost of the total project including coastal reservoir, contour canals, water pumping stations, solar/wind/hydro power plants, canal drop hydro power stations, main canals, tunnels, aqueducts, barrages and distribution canals is estimated nearly  125 trillion  (lakh crores INR) at year 2021 prices. The irrigation potential of the project alone is 300 million acres with water supply throughout the year. It is a gigantic multi purpose project where cleaning of many major rivers of India by providing adequate base flows and minimum environmental flows (not Ganges river alone) from the water pollution is one of its purpose.

Clean Ganga Fund 
The Union Cabinet gave its approval for setting up of Clean Ganga Fund in September 2014 with the aim of using the collection for various activities under the Namami Gange programme for cleaning the Ganges.

Utilisation of funds:

 Cleaning up of the Ganges
 Setting up of waste treatment plants
 Conservation of biotic diversity of the river
 Development of public amenities
 Activities such as ghat redevelopment, research and development, and innovative projects

National Mission for Clean Ganga

The National Mission for Clean Ganga (NMCG) is the implementation wing of National Ganga Council which was set up in October 2016 under the River Ganga (Rejuvenation, Protection and Management) Authorities order 2016. The order dissolved National Ganga River Basin Authority. The aim is to clean the Ganges and its tributaries in a comprehensive manner. Gajendra Singh Shekhawat is the present  Union Cabinet Minister in Ministry of Jal Shakti.

Namami Gange Programme

Under National Mission for Clean Ganga, Namami Gange Programme was launched in 2014. This is a Flagship program under Union Government. A budget of 20,000 crore was given with the twin objective of effective abatement of pollution, conservation and rejuvenation of National River Ganga. Unlike previous projects for cleaning Ganga, Namami Gange is most comprehensive river conservation program.

Protests for cleaning the Ganges

Nigamanand

In early 2011, a Hindu monk named Swami Nigamananda Saraswati fasted to death, protesting against pollutive river bed quarrying of the Ganges happening in the district of Haridwar, Uttarakhand. Following his death in June 2011, his ashram leader Swami Shivananda fasted for 11 days starting on 25 November 2011, taking his movement forward. On 5 December 2011, the Government of Uttarakhand released an order to ban river bed mining in the Bhogpur and Bishanpur ghats. According to administration officials, quarrying in the Ganges would now be studied by a special committee which would assess its environmental impacts on the river and its nearby areas.

G. D. Agrawal

G. D. Agrawal was an environment activist and patron of Ganga Mahasabha, an organisation founded by Madan Mohan Malviya in 1905, demanding removal of dams on Ganges. Because of support from other social activists like Anna Hazare, the then-Prime Minister of India, Manmohan Singh agreed to Agrawal's demands. Accordingly, he called for a National River Ganga Basin Authority (NRGBA) meeting and urged the authorities to utilise the ₹26 billion (US$520M) sanctioned "for creating sewer networks, sewage treatment plants, sewage pumping stations, electric crematoria, community toilets and development of river fronts". Agrawal died on 11 October 2018, after being on an indefinite fast since 22 June 2018, demanding the government act on its promises to clean and save the Ganges.

See also

 Yamuna
 Yamuna Action Plan
 Water pollution in India
 Farakka Barrage
 Indian Rivers Inter-link
 Kalpasar Project
 Land reclamation
 Water export
 Electricity sector in India#Solar power
 Ganges Barrage Project
 Geography of Bangladesh
 Geography of Nepal

References

External links
Yamuna Mission
 Ganga gets dirtier by the day as the Government dithers -- Daily Pioneer
 National River Conservation Directorate
 Eco Friends Ganges conservation
  - Ganga Action Plan Phase I (June-1985 to 31 March 2000)
   - Planning Commission Report On Utilization of Funds and Assets Created Through Ganga Action Plan in States Under Gap
 [nmcg.nic.in National Mission for clean Ganga]

Water pollution in India
Pollution in India